Lucerne is an unincorporated community in Harrison Township, Cass County, Indiana.

History
Lucerne was platted in 1883 when the railroad was extended to that point. The community took its name from Lucerne, in Switzerland. The Lucerne post office was established in 1891.

Geography

References

Unincorporated communities in Cass County, Indiana
Unincorporated communities in Indiana